Enda Smith (born 6 August 1994) is a Gaelic footballer who plays at senior level for the Roscommon county team and is from Boyle, County Roscommon in Ireland.

Career
Smith plays his club football for the Boyle GAA club. While at university, he played for DCU where he won the Sigerson Cup in 2015 against UCC. During his university GAA matches, he formed a rivalry with UCC's Conor Cox who played county football for Kerry and later joined Smith at Roscommon. Smith made his senior inter-county debut for Roscommon in 2013. He was part of the Roscommon team that made it to the Super 8s stage of the All-Ireland Senior Football Championship after winning the 2017 Connacht Senior Football Championship but lost to Tyrone. Despite this, he was nominated for the GAA GPA All Stars Awards. By 2019, he had become the Roscommon county captain. Before the season started, he had fractured a bone in his hand but made a substitute appearance to score the winning point in the final of the 2019 Connacht Senior Football Championship against Mayo.

On 25 October 2017, Smith was named in the Ireland squad for the 2017 International Rules Series against Australia in November following Dublin GAA players declining to take part in the series due to club commitments and rest breaks.

Personal life
Smith has three brothers, Cian and Donie, have played Gaelic football for Roscommon at differing levels. Until 2018, he studied at Dublin City University. Smith works as a teacher in Dublin, away from Gaelic football.

Career Statistics 
As of match played 11 June 2022

References

1994 births
Living people
Allied Irish Banks people
Roscommon inter-county Gaelic footballers